Ronin, in comics, may refer to:

 Ronin (DC Comics), a DC graphic novel by Frank Miller.
 Ronin (Marvel Comics), a Marvel Comics character.
 Ronin (Star Wars comics), a Marvel Comics Star Wars series.
 Ronin Hood of the 47 Samurai, a story combining Robin Hood and the 47 Ronin.

See also
 Ronin (disambiguation)
 Ronan the Accuser, another Marvel character